Central Coast Stadium (known originally as Grahame Park), known commercially as Industree Group Stadium is a sports venue in Gosford, on the Central Coast of New South Wales, Australia. The stadium is home to the Central Coast Mariners association football club which competes in the A-League. The stadium also hosts rugby league and rugby union fixtures on an ad hoc basis as well as other major social events.

The stadium was originally designed to be the home stadium for the North Sydney Bears rugby league football club.

The stadium is rectangular and is unusual in that seating is located on only three sides of the ground. The southern end is open giving filtered views of Brisbane Water through a row of palm trees. With an all seater capacity of 20,059 it was  the second smallest stadium in the A-League. It is within walking distance of the Gosford CBD and Gosford railway station. The Central Coast Leagues Club and League Club Field are adjacent to the stadium, across Dane Drive.

History
In 1911, Erina Shire Council proposed to create a park on the shore of Brisbane Water. The park required much land to be reclaimed from marshland. It also required privately owned land to be purchased by council and a section of road to be demolished. Waterside Park was opened in 1915 and a cricket pitch was added during that year. Further reclamation of the foreshore extended the park during the Depression that gave work to the unemployed. By 1939 surplus railway land had been added and a Bowling Club and green as well as tennis courts had been constructed. In 1939 the Park was renamed Grahame Park, after the then mayor of Gosford, William Calman Grahame.

A full stadium was then touted and later built in the late 1990s, planned to be ready in 1999 for NRL club the North Sydney Bears, before construction problems including large spells of inclement weather delayed completion. The stadium finally opened in early 2000 as NorthPower Stadium at Grahame Park, the Northern Eagles National Rugby League team (a merging of the aforementioned Bears and the Manly Sea Eagles) taking residence there until their dissolving at the conclusion of the 2002 season.

In 2003, with no major sporting team in residence, the stadium played host to three group matches in the 2003 Rugby World Cup. The Pacific Islanders rugby union team played one match at the stadium on their 2004 tour.

The stadium gained its second full-time tenant in 2005 with the formation of the Central Coast Mariners, a team in the newly formed national A-League football competition. It became the first full-time national sporting competition to have a team play at the stadium. Further use of the stadium in 2006 follows from it being the home ground to the Central Coast Waves rugby union team, which joined the Shute Shield in 2006.

The stadium continues to host NRL competition matches from time to time, as well as a number of pre-season trials. The Central Coast Rays, the Central Coasts' Australian Rugby Championship team, played out of the stadium during the only season of the competition in 2007. The stadium continued as a home to the Mariners A-League side , and hosted NRL matches throughout the 2008 Centenary Year. In 2014, the NSW Country Eagles hosted a National Rugby Championship match at Central Coast.

In recent years the Sydney Roosters have hosted one NRL game per season at Central Coast Stadium; other clubs such as the South Sydney Rabbitohs, Wests Tigers, Manly-Warringah Sea Eagles and Canterbury-Bankstown Bulldogs have also taken games to the Central Coast. In 2004, Central Coast Stadium played host to two North Queensland Cowboys matches, the first of which resulted in a historic 20–20 draw with wooden spooners South Sydney, the first such result since golden point was introduced in 2003.

In the 2020 and the first four months of the 2021 NRL seasons, the ground was used as a temporary home ground for the New Zealand Warriors, due to border restrictions between Australia and New Zealand which prevented the club from travelling freely between the two countries during the COVID-19 pandemic.

VenuesLive took over the management of the ground from the Central Coast Council on July 1, 2022.

Name changes
There has been several name changes since the Stadium was built, primarily reactions relating to sponsorship: 
 Waterside Park, from 1915;
 Grahame Park, from 1939;
 NorthPower Stadium at Grahame Park, from January 2000;
 Central Coast Stadium at Grahame Park, from 23 September 2002;
 Central Coast Express Advocate Stadium at Grahame Park, from 11 February 2003;
 Central Coast Stadium at Grahame Park, from 21 March 2005;
 Central Coast Bluetongue Stadium at Grahame Park, from 28 March 2006.
 Central Coast Stadium at Grahame Park, from 25 January 2014;
 Industree Group Stadium, from 14 November 2022

Transport
Gosford railway station is nearby. The station is served by the Central Coast & Newcastle Line and a small number of long-distance services.

Attendance records
Record crowds for different sports:

Rugby league test matches
The stadium has hosted one rugby league international.

Rugby World Cup
The stadium hosted three games of the 2003 Rugby World Cup which was held in Australia.

References

External links

Official website for Central Coast Stadium
National Rugby League
A-League Football
Central Coast Mariners

Central Coast Mariners FC
A-League Men stadiums
A-League Women stadiums
Rugby league stadiums in Australia
Rugby union stadiums in Australia
Rugby League World Cup stadiums
Rugby World Cup stadiums
Sports venues in New South Wales
Northern Eagles
North Sydney Bears
2000 establishments in Australia
Sports venues completed in 2000
New South Wales Waratahs
Sport on the Central Coast (New South Wales)